Horace is a masculine given name, derived from the Roman poet Quintus Horatius Flaccus (65 BC–8 BC).

List of people
Notable people with the name include:

Horace A. Tenney (1820–1906), American politician
Horace Abbott (1806–1887), American iron manufacturer and banker
Horace Alexander (1889–1989), English Quaker teacher, writer, pacifist, and ornithologist
Horace Alexander Young (born 1954), American saxophonist and flute player
Horace Allen (disambiguation), several people
Horace Andy (born 1951), Jamaican reggae singer
Horace Annesley Vachell (1861–1955), English writer
Horace Archambeault (1857–1918), Canadian politician and judge
Horace Armitage, English football player and manager between 1908 and 1911
Horace Arnold (born 1937), American jazz drummer
Horace Arthur Rose (1867–1933), Indian administrator
Horace Ashenfelter (1923–2018), American athlete
Horace Astley (1882–?), English footballer
Horace Augustus Curtis (1891–1968), English soldier
Horace Austerberry (1868–1946), English football manager
Horace Austin (1831–1905), American politician
Horace Avory (1851–1935), English High Court judge
Horace Aylwin (1902–1980), Canadian sprinter
Horace B. Cheney (1868–1938), American administrator and businessman
Horace B. Griffen (1894–1972), American baseball player, newspaper businessman, and politician
Horace B. Strait (1835–1894), American politician
Horace B. Warner (1876–1915), New York assemblyman
Horace B. Willard (1825–1900), American politician, physician, and businessman
Horace Bailey (1881–1960), English amateur footballer
Horace Baker (politician) (1869–1941), American politician
Horace Baker (footballer) (1910–1974), English footballer
Horace Baldwin (1801–1850), American mayor
Horace Baldwin Rice (1861–1929), American businessman and mayor
Horace Barber (1914–1971), Australian botanist and geneticist
Horace Barker (1907–2000), American biochemist and microbiologist
Horace Barks (1895–1983), English mayor
Horace Barlow (1921–2020), British vision scientist
Horace Barnes (1891–1961), English footballer
Horace Barnet (1856–1941), English soldier and footballer
Horace Barton (1891–1975), South African World War I flying ace
Horace Bastings (1831–1909), New Zealand politician
Horace Batchelor (1898–1977), English gambling advertiser
Horace Bates (1793–1879), English cricketer
Horace Batten (1912–2014), English shoemaker and bootmaker
Horace Baugh (1916–2007), Canadian Anglican priest
Horace Beevor Love (1800–1838), English portrait painter
Horace Bell (1830–1918), American writer, soldier, and lawyer
Horace Bell (engineer) (1839–1903), English civil engineer
Horace Belshaw (1898–1962), New Zealand teacher, economist, and university professor
Horace Belton (1955–2019), American CFL and NFL player
Horace-Bénédict de Saussure (1740–1799), Swiss scientist and mountain pioneer
Horace Berry (1891–1949), Australian politician
Horace Bigelow (1898–1980), American chess master and organizer
Horace Biggin (1897–1984), English footballer
Horace Billings Packer (1851–1940), American politician
Horace Binney (1780–1875), American politician, lawyer, author, and public speaker
Horace Binney Sargent (1821–1908), American soldier and politician
Horace Binney Wallace (1817–1852), American attorney, art and literature critic, and author
Horace Birks (1897–1985), British soldier
Horace Bivins (1862–1960), American soldier
Horace Blew (1878–1957), Welsh international footballer
Horace Blois Burnham (1824–1894), American Army officer, lawyer, and judge
Horace Bloomfield (1891–1973), English cricketer
Horace Boies (1827–1923), American politician
Horace Bolingbroke Woodward (1848–1914), British geologist
Horace Bonser (1882–1934), American sport shooter
Horace Bookwalter Drury (1888–1968), American economist, lecturer, and management author
Horace Botsford (1877–1948), American football coach
Horace Bowden (1880–1958), Australian politician
Horace Bowen (1841–1902), Chief Cashier of the Bank of England from 1893 to 1902
Horace Bowker (1877–1954), American farm economist and businessman
Horace Brearley (1913–2007), English cricketer and schoolmaster
Horace Brigham Claflin (1811–1885), American merchant
Horace Brindley (1885–1971), English footballer
Horace Brinsmead (1883–1934), Controller of Aviation in Australia between 1920 and 1933
Horace Bristol (1908–1997), American photographer
Horace Bristol Pond (1882–?), American business executive, philanthropist, American Red Cross personnel, World War II prisoner, and an expatriate in the Philippines
Horace Broadnax (born 1964), American college basketball coach
Horace Brodzky (1885–1969), Australian-born artist and writer
Horace Brooks (1814–1894), American soldier
Horace Brooks Marshall, 1st Baron Marshall of Chipstead (1865–1936), English publisher, newspaper distributor, and Lord Mayor of London, 1918–1919
Horace Brown (disambiguation), several people
Horace Bullard (1938–2013), American entrepreneur
Horace Bumstead (1841–1919), American Congregationalist minister and educator
Horace Bundy (1814–1883), American portrait painter
Horace Busby (1924–2000), American opinion journalist, speechwriter, consultant, and public relations expert
Horace Bushnell (1802–1876), American Congregational minister and theologian
Horace Butterworth (1868–1939), American college football coach
Horace Byatt (1875–1933), British colonial governor
Horace C. Lee (1822–1884), American military officer
Horace C. Spencer (1832–1926), American politician
Horace Campbell, American international peace and justice scholar and professor
Horace Capron (1804–1885), American businessman, agriculturalist, general, foreign advisor- and educator, and expatriate
Horace Capron Jr. (1840–1864), American soldier
Horace Carpenter (disambiguation), several people
Horace Carpentier (1824–1918), American lawyer, mayor, and telegraph company president
Horace Caulkins (1850–1923), American ceramic artist and engineer
Horace Champagne (born 1937), Canadian artist
Horace Chang (born 1952), Jamaican doctor and politician
Horace Chapin Henry (1844–1928), American businessman, soldier, railroad builder, and banker
Horace Chapman (disambiguation), several people
Horace Charles Mules (1856–1939), British civil servant and colonial administrator
Horace Chase (1810–1886), American politician and pioneer
Horace Chenery (1886–1971), British wrestler
Horace Cheung (born 1974), Hong Kong solicitor and politician
Horace Chevrier (1876–1935), Canadian merchant and political figure
Horace Chilton (1853–1932), American printer, lawyer, and politician
Horace Clarence Boyer (1935–2009), American gospel music singer
Horace Clark (disambiguation), several people
Horace Clarke (1939–2020), American MLB player
Horace Cleveland (1814–1900), American landscape architect
Horace Cohen (born 1971), Dutch actor and comedian
Horace Cooper Wrinch (1866–1939), English-born physician, Canadian political figure, and Methodist minister
Horace Craske, male athlete who competed for England at the 1934 British Empire Games
Horace Crawfurd (1881–1958), British politician
Horace Crotty (1886–1952), Anglican bishop in Australia and England
Horace Cumner (1918–1999), Welsh international footballer
Horace Cutler (1912–1997), British politician
Horace Daggett (1931–1998), American farmer and politician
Horace Dalley (born 1950), Jamaican educator and politician
Horace Dammers (1921–2004), English Anglican dean and author
Horace Darwin (1851–1928), English engineer
Horace Davenport (1850–1925), English swimmer
Horace Davey, Baron Davey (1833–1907), English judge and politician
Horace Davies (1903–1971), Australian politician
Horace Davis (1831–1916), American politician
Horace Dawkins (1867–1944), British politician
Horace Dawson (born 1926), American diplomat
Horace Dawswell (1896–1966), British gymnast
Horace Day (1909–1984), American painter
Horace Dean (1814–1887), American-born Australian doctor, journalist, and political candidate
Horace Debenham (1903–1993), British rower
Horace Dediu (born 1968), Romanian-American industry analyst
Horace Deighton (1831–?), Trinidadian cricketer
Horace DeVauhan (died 1927), American criminal
Horace de Vere Cole (1881–1936), British prankster
Horace de Viel-Castel (1802–1864), French art-lover, collector, and museum director
Horace Dimick (1809?–1874), American gunsmith and firearms dealer
Horace Disston (1906–1982), American field hockey player
Horace Dixon (1899–1978), New Zealand rugby league player
Horace Dixon (bishop) (1869–1964), British priest in the Church of England
Horace Dobbins (1868–1962), American businessman and politician
Horace Dobbs (born 1933), British scientist, researcher, author, and television producer
Horace Dobell (1828–1917), English doctor and medical writer
Horace Dodge (1868–1920), American car manufacturer
Horace Donisthorpe (1870–1951), British entomologist
Horace Dove-Edwin (born 1967), Sierra Leonean sprinter
Horace Duckett (1867–1939), English rugby union and professional rugby league footballer
Horace Dutton Taft (1861–1943), American educator
Horace Dyer (1873–1928), American football player and attorney
Horace E. Bemis (1868–1914), American college football player and lumber dealer
Horace E. Deemer (1858–1917), American state court judge
Horace Eaton (1804–1855), American politician and medical doctor
Horace Edmonds (1908–1975), Australian rules footballer
Horace Edward Manners Fildes (1875–1937), New Zealand postmaster, book collector, and bibliographer
Horace Edward Ramsden (1878–1948), English military emigrant to South Africa
Horace Elgin Dodge (1868–1920), American automobile manufacturing pioneer
Horace Ellis (1843–1867), American soldier
Horace Ellis Crouch (1918–2005), American military aviator
Horace Elmo Nichols (1912–2000), American lawyer, jurist, and judge
Horace Engdahl (born 1948), Swedish literary critic
Horace Evans, 1st Baron Evans (1903–1963), Welsh general physician
Horace Everett (1779–1851), American politician
Horace Everett Hooper (1859–1922), American editor and publisher
Horace Ezra Bixby (1826–1912), American steamboat pilot, steamboat captain, and inventor
Horace F. Bartine (1848–1918), American politician
Horace F. Clark (1815–1873), American railroad executive and politician
Horace F. Graham (1862–1941), American politician
Horace F. Page (1833–1890), American politician
Horace Fairbanks (1820–1888), American politician
Horace Fairhurst (1893–1921), English professional footballer
Horace Faith, Jamaican reggae singer
Horace Farquhar, 1st Earl Farquhar (1844–1923), British financier, courtier, and politician
Horace Field (1861–1948), English architect
Horace Field Parshall (1865–1932), American-born British electrical engineer
Horace Fielding (1906–1969), English professional footballer
Horace Finaly (1871–1945), French financier, banker, and art collector
Horace Finch (1906–1980), English pianist and organist
Horace Fisher (1903–1974), English cricketer
Horace Fisher (painter) (1861–1928), British painter
Horace Fleming, Irish man who was the Dean of Cloyne from 1884 to 1909
Horace Fletcher (1849–1919), American dietitian
Horace Fletcher (footballer) (1876–1931), English footballer
Horace Fogel (1861–1928), MLB manager
Horace Foley (1900–1989), Australian medical practitioner and mayor
Horace Forbes, 19th Lord Forbes (1829–1914), Scottish peer
Horace Ford (disambiguation), several people
Horace Francis (1821–1894), British architect
Horace Howard Furness (1833–1912), American Shakepearean scholar
Horace Francis Barnes (1902–1960), English entomologist
Horace François Bastien Sébastiani de La Porta (1771–1851), French general, diplomat, and politician
Horace Freeland Judson (1931–2011), American historian of molecular biology
Horace G. Hutchins (1811–1877), American politician
Horace G. Knowles (1863–1937), American attorney and diplomat
Horace G. Snover (1847–1924), American politician and judge
Horace G. Wadlin (1851–1925), American statistician, economist, librarian, and architect
Horace Gager (1917–1984), English professional footballer
Horace Garner (1923–1995), American baseball player
Horace Gaul (1883–1939), Canadian professional ice hockey- and lacrosse player
Horace Geoffrey Quaritch Wales (1900–1981), historian educated in England
Horace Gifford (1932–1992), American beach house architect
Horace Gillom (1921–1985), American football player
Horace Ginsbern (1902–1987), American architect
Horace Glover (1883–1967), English professional footballer
Horace Goldin (1873–1939), Russian stage magician
Horace Gould (1921–1968), British racing driver
Horace Grangel (1908–1970), Australian cricketer
Horace Grant (born 1965), American basketball player
Horace Grant Underwood (1859–1916), English missionary
Horace Gray (1828–1902), American judge
Horace Gray (cricketer) (1874–1938), English cricketer, educator, and clergyman
Horace Greasley (1918–2010), British soldier
Horace Greeley (1811–1872), American newspaper editor and publisher
Horace Greeley Knapp, American architect
Horace Greely Prettyman (1857–1945), American football player
Horace Green (1918–2000), English professional footballer
Horace Gregory (1898–1982), American poet, translator, literary critic, and college professor
Horace Griffin, American Episcopal minister
Horace Griggs Prall (1881–1951), American attorney and politician
Horace Grocott (1880–1963), New Zealand Baptist missionary, Boys’ Brigade leader, and postmaster
Horace Günzburg (1833–1909), Russian philanthropist
Horace Gwynne (1912–2001), Canadian bantamweight professional boxer
Horace H. Cummings (1858–1937), American educator and Mormon leader
Horace H. Fuller (1886–1966), American soldier
Horace H. Smith (1905–1976), American diplomat
Horace Hagedorn (1915–2005), American advertising executive, businessman, and philanthropist
Horace Hahn (1915–2003), American actor
Horace Hall, English businessman
Horace Hall Edwards (1902–1987), American politician
Horace Hamilton (1880–1971), British civil servant
Horace Hardwick (1935–2020), American politician
Horace Harmon Lurton (1844–1914), American Supreme Court Justice and Circuit Judge
Horace Harned (1920–2017), American politician
Horace Harper (1898–1970), Australian politician
Horace Harral (1817–1905), British wood-engraver, etcher, and photographer
Horace Harrison (1829–1885), American politician
Horace Hart (1840–1916), English printer and biographer
Horace Hart (footballer) (1894–1975), English footballer
Horace Harvey (1863–1949), Canadian lawyer, jurist, and a Chief Justice
Horace Harvey (bowls), South African international lawn bowler
Horace Haszard (1853–1922), Canadian wholesale merchant and political figure
Horace Hawkins, British socialist
Horace Hawkins (musician) (1880–1966), English classical organist
Horace Hazell (1909–1990), English cricketer
Horace Hearne (1892–1962), English barrister and judge
Horace Heidt (1901–1986), American bandleader
Horace Helmbold (1867–1939), American MLB player
Horace Henderson (1904–1988), American jazz pianist, organist, arranger, and bandleader
Horace Hendrickson (1910–2004), American football-, basketball-, and baseball player, coach, and athletics administrator
Horace Henry Baxter (1818–1884), American businessman
Horace Henry Glasock (1880–1916), English-born South African soldier
Horace Henry White (1864–1946), American lawyer and civic leader
Horace Henshall (1889–1951), English footballer and manager
Horace Herring (1884–1962), English mechanical engineer, draughtsman, and emigrant politician to New Zealand
Horace Hildreth (1902–1988), American lawyer and politician
Horace Hiller (1844–1898), American businessman
Horace His de la Salle (1795–1878), French art collector
Horace Hodes (1907–1989), American pediatrician and disease researcher
Horace Hodges (1863–1951), British stage- and film actor and writer
Horace Hogan (born 1965), American professional wrestler
Horace Hogben (1888–1975), Australian politician
Horace Holden (born 1963), American slalom canoer
Horace Holley (disambiguation), several people
Horace Holmes (1888–1971), British politician and trade union official
Horace Hood (1870–1916), British admiral
Horace Hooker (1793–1864), American Congregationalist minister and author
Horace Horton (1823–1902), Canadian insurance agent and political figure
Horace Howard Furness (1833–1912), American Shakespearean scholar
Horace Hunt (1907–1984), Australian cricketer
Horace Huntley, American professor, historian and writer
Horace Husler (1890–1959), English professional footballer
Horace Hutchinson (1859–1932), English golfer
Horace Ivory (born 1954), American football player
Horace Jackson (1898–1952), American filmmaker, screenwriter, and set designer
Horace Jackson (filmmaker) (fl.1963 - 1976), American filmmaker, and educator
Horace Jacobs (1816–1884), American doctor
Horace Jacobs Rice (1882–1964), American attorney, legal instructor, and academic dean
Horace James (disambiguation), several people
Horace James Seymour (1885–1978), British diplomat
Horace Jansen Beemer (c. 1845–1912), American railway contractor and businessman in Canada
Horace Jarnigan (1909–1977), American baseball player
Horace Jayne (1859–1913), American zoologist and educator
Horace Jenkins (born 1974), American former NBA player
Horace Jenkins (baseball) (1891–1962), American baseball player
Horace Jones (disambiguation), several people
Horace Joules (1902–1977), British physician, health administrator, and health campaigner
Horace Judson (disambiguation), several people
Horace K. Hathaway (1878–1944), American consulting engineer and lecturer
Horace Kadoorie (1902–1995), industrialist, hotelier, and philanthropist in Shanghai and Hong Kong
Horace Kallen (1882–1974), German-born American philosopher
Horace Keats (1895–1945), English-born Australian composer, arranger, piano accompanist, and conductor
Horace Kelley (1819–1890), American industrialist and philanthropist
Horace Kenton Wright (1915–1976), American-born Bahamian artist and teacher
Horace Kephart (1862–1931), American travel writer and librarian
Horace King (disambiguation), several people
Horace Knight (fl. 1901–1920), British natural history illustrator
Horace Kolimba (1939–1997), Tanzanian politician
Horace L. Friess (1900–1975), American ethicist
Horace L. McBride (1894–1962), American Army officer
Horace LaBissoniere (1896–1972), American football player and politician
Horace Lamb (1849–1934), British mathematician
Horace Lambart, 11th Earl of Cavan (1878–1950), Anglo-Irish soldier and Anglican priest
Horace Law (1911–2005), British military officer
Horace Lawson Hunley (1823–1863), American marine engineer
Horace Lecoq de Boisbaudran (1802–1897), French artist and teacher
Horace Lee (1909–1981), English cricketer
Horace Lindrum (1912–1974), Australian professional snooker- and billiards player
Horace Liveright (1884–1933), American publisher and stage producer
Horace Lloyd (1828–1874), English barrister
Horace Locklear (born 1942), American politician and former attorney
Horace Logan (1916–2002), American radio personality
Horace Loh (born 1937), Chinese-born Taiwanese biochemist
Horace Lucian Arnold (1837–1915), American engineer, inventor, engineering journalist, and writer
Horace Lunt (1918–2010), American linguist and professor
Horace Lyddon (1912–1968), English Navy officer and college president
Horace Lyman (1815–1887), American reverend and math professor
Horace Lyne (1860–1949), Welsh international rugby player
Horace M. Albright (1890–1987), American conservationist
Horace M. Singer (1823–1896), American businessman and politician
Horace M. Stone (1890–1944), New York politician
Horace M. Thorne (1918–1944), American Army soldier
Horace Mackennal (died 1949), Australian architect
Horace Mann (1796–1859), American politician and education reformer
Horace Mann Bond (1904–1972), American historian, college administrator, and social science researcher
Horace Mann Jr. (1844–1868), American botanist
Horace Mann Thu-Jaune (born 1963), Malagasy politician
Horace Mann Towner (1855–1937), American politician
Horace Marryat (1818–1887), English traveler and author
Horace Martelli (1877–1959), British Army officer
Horace Martin (born 1985), Jamaican-Dutch kickboxer
Horace Martineau (1874–1916), British soldier
Horace Mayhew (1845–1926), British mining engineer and colliery owner
Horace Mayhew (journalist) (1816–1872), English journalist and humorist
Horace Maynard (1814–1882), American educator, attorney, politician, and diplomat
Horace McCoy (1897–1955), American writer
Horace McKenna (1899–1982), American Catholic activist and social worker
Horace McKinney (1919–1997), American professional basketball player and coach
Horace McMahon (1906–1971), American actor
Horace Meek Hickam (1885–1934), American pioneer airpower advocate and Army officer
Horace Mellard DuBose (1858–1941), American Methodist Episcopal bishop
Horace Mellor (1851–1942), English cricketer
Horace Merrick (1887–1961), English cricketer, soldier, and school teacher
Horace Merrill (1884–1958), Canadian professional ice hockey player
Horace Micallef (born 1959), Maltese sports shooter
Horace Milan (1894–1955), American MLB player
Horace Miller (disambiguation), several people
Horace Mills (1864–1941), British singer, actor, and dramatist
Horace Mitchell (1858–1951), English cricketer
Horace Mitchell Miner (1912–1993), American anthropologist
Horace Moore (disambiguation), several people
Horace Moore-Jones (1868–1922), New Zealand artist, soldier, and art teacher
Horace Moulden (1898–1988), British trade union leader
Horace Moule Evans (1841–1923), Indian Army officer
Horace Murphy (1880–1975), American film actor
Horace Nelson (1878–1962), American politician
Horace Newcomb, American television critic, writer, and mass media scholar
Horace Newte (1870–1949), English playwright, novelist, and columnist
Horace Newton (1844–1920), British Anglican priest, philanthropist, and country landowner
Horace Nicholls (1867–1941), English photographer
Horace Nobbs (1880–?), British trade unionist and political activist
Horace Nock (1879–1958), Australian politician, farmer, and company director
Horace Northcutt (1883–1950), American politician
Horace Norton (1896–1976), English professional footballer
Horace Notice (born 1957), English plasterer and boxer
Horace Nunn (1891–1957), New Zealand rugby footballer
Horace Odell (1910–1984), American javelin thrower
Horace Ott (born 1933), American jazz and R&B composer, arranger, record producer, conductor, and pianist
Horace Ové (born 1939), British filmmaker
Horace Owens (born 1961), American basketball coach, player, and assistant coach
Horace P. Biddle (1811–1900), American lawyer, judge, poet, musicologist, and hermit
Horace Packe (1865–1934), New Zealand Archdeacon
Horace Panter (born 1953), English bassist for The Specials
Horace Parlan (1931–2017), American pianist and composer
Horace Parmelee (1889–1957), American talent manager and concert promoter
Horace Parnell Tuttle (1837–1923), American astronomer and army and navy officer
Horace Patch (1814–1862), American politician
Horace Pauleus Sannon (1870–1938), Haitian historian, politician, and diplomat
Horace Peacock (1869–1940), English cricketer and British Army officer
Horace Pearson (1907–?), English footballer
Horace Percy Lale (1886–1955), British Air Force officer
Horace Perkins (born 1954), American football player
Horace Perry (1905–1962), English cricketer
Horace Petty (1904–1982), Australian politician
Horace Phillips (disambiguation), several people
Horace Pike (1869–1936), English footballer
Horace Pippin (1888–1946), American painter
Horace Pittaway (born 1941), South African cricketer
Horace Pitt-Rivers, 3rd Baron Rivers (1777–1831), British nobleman and gambler
Horace Pitt-Rivers, 6th Baron Rivers (1814–1880), British peer and army officer
Horace Plunkett (1854–1932), Anglo-Irish agricultural reformer, author, and politician
Horace Poolaw (1906–1984), American-born Kiowa photographer
Horace Porter (1837–1921), American soldier and diplomat
Horace Poussard (1829–1898), French violinist and composer
Horace Price (1863–1941), English Anglican missionary
Horace Prince (1900–1977), New Zealand cricketer
Horace Pym (1844–1896), English confidential solicitor, book collector, and journal editor
Horace R. Buck (1853–1897), American Supreme Court Justice
Horace R. Byers (1906–1998), American meteorologist
 Horace R. Cayton, Sr. (1859–1940), African-American newspaper publisher
 Horace R. Cayton, Jr. (1903–1970), American sociologist, son of the above
Horace R. Kornegay (1924–2009), American politician
Horace Racine (1905–1994), Canadian politician
Horace Rackham (1858–1933), American lawyer, stockholder, and philanthropist
Horace Ramey (1885–1974), American athlete
Horace Randal (1833–1864), American soldier
Horace Rawlins (1874–1935), English professional golfer
Horace Reid (cricketer) (born 1935), Jamaican cricketer
Horace Rendall Mansfield (1863–1914), British politician
Horace Ricardo (1850–1935), British military officer and land owner
Horace Rice (1872–1950), Australian tennis player
Horace Richardson (1854–1935), Australian politician
Horace Richardson (American football) (born 1993), American football player
Horace Rickett (1912–1989), English professional football goalkeeper
Horace Ridler (1892–1969), English professional freak and sideshow performer
Horace Robertson (1894–1960), Australian military officer
Horace Roome (1887–1964), British military officer
Horace Rowan Gaither (1909–1961), American attorney, investment banker, and administrator
Horace Roye (1906–2002), British photographer
Horace Rublee (1829–1896), American journalist, newspaper editor, politician, and ambassador to Switzerland
Horace Rudston (1878–1962), English cricketer
Horace Rumbold (disambiguation), several people
Horace S. Carswell Jr. (1916–1944), American Army major
Horace S. Eldredge (1816–1888), American Mormon leader
Horace Sandford (1891–1967), Australian cricketer
Horace Scudder (1838–1902), American writer and editor
Horace Searle Anderson (1833–1907), British Indian Army officer
Horace Secrist (1881–1943), American statistician and economist
Horace Sedger (1853–1917), American-born British theatre manager and impresario
Horace See (1835–1909), American mechanical engineer, marine engineer, naval architect, inventor, and superintendent
Horace Seely-Brown Jr. (1908–1982), American politician
Horace Sewell (1881–1953), British Army officer
Horace Seymour (1791–1851), English Army officer and politician
Horace Sheffield III (born 1954), American pastor and media personality
Horace Sheldon, British composer, orchestra leader, and stage- and musical director
Horace Sherrell (1886–1940), American college football player and coach
Horace Sholl (1851–1927), Australian pastoralist and politician
Horace Signor Brannon (1884–1970), American physician
Horace Silliman (1825–1910), American businessman, philanthropist, and a layman in the Presbyterian Church
Horace Silver (1928–2014), American jazz musician, composer, and arranger
Horace Smirk (1902–1991), New Zealand medicine professor
Horace Smith (disambiguation), several people
Horace Smith-Dorrien (1858–1930), British general
Horace Smithy (1914–1948), American cardiac surgeon
Horace Snary (1897–1966), English cricketer
Horace Speed (1852–1924), American pioneer and attorney
Horace Speed (baseball) (born 1951), American MLB outfielder
Horace Sprott (1899–c.1992), American songster and harmonica player
Horace Stanley Colliver (1874–1957), Canadian businessman and political figure
Horace Stansel (1888–1936), American civil engineer and politician
Horace Stansfield Collier (1864–1930), British surgeon
Horace Stern (1878–1969), American Supreme Court Justice
Horace Stevens (1876–1950), Australian singer, Army officer, singing teacher, and sculler
Horace Stoneham (1903–1990), American MLB executive
Horace Stoute (born 1971), Barbadian international footballer
Horace Strutt (1903–1985), Australian Army officer and politician
Horace Sumner Lyman (1855–1904), American journalist, historian, and educator
Horace Sweeney Oakley (1861–1929), American lawyer, scholar, and philanthropist
Horace T. Cahill (1894–1976), American politician
Horace Tabor (1830–1899), American prospector, businessman, and politician
Horace Tapscott (1934–1999), American jazz pianist and composer
Horace Tate (1922–2002), American educator, activist, scholar, and politician
Horace Taylor (disambiguation), several people
Horace Tennyson O'Rourke (1880–1963), Irish architect
Horace Terhune Herrick (1887–1948), American scientist and agriculture director
Horace Thomas (1890–1916), Welsh international rugby union and Army personnel
Horace Thompson (1900–?), English footballer
Horace Tonks (1891–1959), British Anglican colonial bishop
Horace Tozer (1844–1916), Australian lawyer and politician
Horace Tracy Pitkin (1869–1900), American missionary
Horace Traubel (1858–1919), American essayist, poet, magazine publisher, author, and Georgist
Horace Trevor-Cox (1908–2005), British farmer, landowner, and politician
Horace Trubridge (born 1957), English trade union leader and musician
Horace Trumbauer (1868–1938), American architect
Horace Tuck (1876–1951), English artist
Horace Tuitt (born 1954), Trinidad and Tobago sprinter
Horace Tulloch (born 1930), Jamaican cricketer
Horace Twiss (1787–1849), English writer and politician
Horace Valentin Crocicchia (1888–1976), French colonial governor and administrator
Horace Venn (1892–1953), English cricketer
Horace Vere, 1st Baron Vere of Tilbury (1565–1635), English military leader
Horace Vernet (1789–1863), French painter
Horace Viner (1877–1935), Welsh professional footballer
Horace W. Babcock (1912–2003), American astronomer
Horace W. Bailey (1852–1914), American politician and government official
Horace W. Bozarth (1894–1976), American politician
Horace W. B. Donegan (1900–1991), American Episcopal Church bishop
Horace W. South (1877–1954), American football coach and educator
Horace W. Wilkie (1917–1976), American attorney, judge, and politician
Horace Walker (1838–1908), English mountaineer
Horace Walker (basketball) (1937–2001), American NBA player
Horace Wallbanks (1918–2004), English professional footballer
Horace Waller (disambiguation), several people
Horace Walls III (born 2001), American rapper
Horace Walpole (1717–1797), English writer, art historian, man of letters, antiquarian, and politician
Horace Walrond (born 1971), Barbadian cricketer
Horace Walter Gilbert (1855–1928), English landscape painter
Horace Walter Rigden (1898–1986), English chemist and oil industry executive
Horace Ward (1927–2016), American lawyer and judge
Horace Waring (1910–1980), English/Australian zoologist
Horace Wass (1903–1969), English sportsman
Horace Waters (1812–1893), American Christian hymnwriter and music publisher
Horace Watts (1901–1959), Canadian Anglican bishop
Horace Webster (1794–1871), American educator
Horace Weldon Gilmore (1918–2010), American judge
Horace Wells (1815–1848), American dentist
Horace Weston (1825–1890), American musician and composer
Horace Wheaton (1803–1882), American businessman and politician
Horace Wheddon (1891–1959), British cinematographer
Horace Whiddon (1879–1955), Australian politician
Horace White (1865–1943), American lawyer and politician
Horace White (writer) (1834–1916), American journalist and financial expert
Horace Whiteside (1891–1956), American football player and football and basketball coach
Horace Wigan (1815/16–1885), English actor, dramatist, and theatre manager
Horace Wilder (1802–1889), American politician, lawyer, and judge
Horace William Finlinson (1871–1956), English rugby international
Horace William Petherick (1839–1919), British artist, illustrator, musician, writer, and violin expert
Horace William Wheelwright (1815–1865), English hunter, naturalist, and writer
Horace Williams (1900–1960), Welsh professional footballer
Horace Williams (cricketer) (1932–2011), Grenadian cricketer
Horace Williams Fuller (1844–1901), American lawyer and editor
Horace Wilson (disambiguation), several people
Horace Winchell Magoun (1907–1991), American neuroscientist
Horace Wolcott Robbins (1842–1904), American painter
Horace Woodard (1904–1973), American film producer and cinematographer
Horace Worth Vaughan (1867–1922), American lawyer, jurist, and politician
Horace Yomishi Mochizuki (1937–1989), American mathematician
Horace Young (disambiguation), several people

Fictional characters
Horace, in the animated television show Family Guy
Horace, an 1840 novel by George Sand
Horace, a daily cartoon strip published in the Daily Mirror
Horace (play), a 1640 play by Pierre Corneille
Horace (television play), a 1972 television play
Horace series, a 1980s video game series
Horace, in the Ranger's Apprentice novel series by John Flanagan
Horace Bleakman, in Clifford the Big Red Dog
Horace Goodspeed, in the television series Lost
Horace Harkness, in the Honor Harrington novels by David Weber
Horace, one of the henchmen in 101 Dalmatians (1996 film)
Horace Horsecollar, a Disney character
Horace James, in the Disney series Flash Forward
Horace Jones, in the 1949 film Angels in Disguise
Horace Pinker, in the 1989 film Shocker
Horace Rumpole, in the television series Rumpole of the Bailey
Horace Slughorn, in the Harry Potter series by J. K. Rowling
Horace Wittel VIII, in Horace and Pete, a 2016 web series created by Louis C.K. (with C.K. starring as Horace)

See also
Horatio
Horatius (disambiguation)
Horus (disambiguation)
Horrie

English masculine given names
French masculine given names